Kanphanitnan "Mind" Muangkhumsakul (born 13 December 1998) is a Thai professional golfer playing on the U.S.-based Epson Tour.

Early life 
Muangkhumsakul was born on 13 December 1998 in Khon Kaen, Thailand. She started playing golf at the age of five.

Professional career 
Muangkhumsakul turned professional in 2013 when she was just 14 years old. In 2014, she capture her first career international win at the Party Golfers Ladies Open on the Taiwan LPGA Tour. She made her first career appearance on the LPGA Tour at the Sime Darby LPGA Malaysia at the Kuala Lumpur Golf & Country Club in October, after winning a 12-player wild card playoff at the same venue.

In 2016, she won her second Taiwan LPGA Tour title at the Hitachi Ladies Classic.

In 2017, she claimed her third Taiwan LPGA Tour victory at the ICTSI Champion Tour at Splendido. In December, she finished tied for 21st at the final stage LPGA Qualifying Tournament to earn LPGA membership for the 2018 season. In 2018, she played five events and made one cut on the LPGA Tour.

In 2019, she played on the Symetra Tour and made 14 cuts in 16 starts with 9 top-15 performances. She finished the season with the tenth place on the Symetra Tour money list and earn LPGA Tour status for the 2020 season.

Amateur wins 
2012 Asia Pacific Junior, TGA-CAT Junior Ranking #1

Source:

Professional wins (12)

Taiwan LPGA Tour wins (3) 
2014 (1) Party Golfers Ladies Open^
2016 (1) Hitachi Ladies Classic
2017 (1) ICTSI Champion Tour at Splendido

^ Co-sanctioned by the Ladies Asian Golf Tour.

Thai LPGA Tour wins (3) 
2013 (1) 5th Singha-SAT Thai LPGA Championship
2015 (1) 4th Singha-SAT Thai LPGA Championship
2016 (1) 1st Singha-SAT Thai LPGA Championship

All Thailand Golf Tour wins (6) 
2013 (2) Singha E-San Open, Singha Bangkok Open
2014 (2) Singha E-San Open, Singha All Thailand Grand Final
2015 (2) Singha Pattaya Open, Singha All Thailand Championship

References

External links 
 
 

Kanphanitnan Muangkhumsakul
LPGA Tour golfers
Kanphanitnan Muangkhumsakul
1998 births
Living people
Kanphanitnan Muangkhumsakul